House of Numbers may refer to:

 House of Numbers, a 1957 novel by Jack Finney
 House of Numbers (1957 film), an American film noir based on the novel
 House of Numbers: Anatomy of an Epidemic, a 2009 American documentary on HIV/AIDS